The Belgian Cross Country Championships is an annual cross country running organised by the Royal Belgian Athletics League that serves as the national championship for the sport in Belgium. It is usually held in February or March.

It was first held in 1896 for men only. A separate women's championship was created in 1970 and the national championship races for both sexes were held in conjunction from 1988 onwards. A short race was added to the programme in 1992, which served as with national selection for that section at the IAAF World Cross Country Championships from 1998 to 2006.

Guest athletes from other nations occasionally compete at the competition, but are not eligible for the national title. Several guests have gone on to place first in the race. In the men's long race New Zealand's Gavin Thorley in 1971, Burundi's Hilaire Ntirampeba in 2000 and Ethiopia's Faisa Dame Tasama in 2007 and 2013. In the women's long race, Lithuania's Stefanija Statkuvienė in 1996 and Ethiopia's Mimi Belete in 2008. The 2012 men's short race was won by Morocco's Abdellah Dacha.

Editions

Men's championship

Women's championship

Combined championship

References

List of winners
National Crosscountry Champions for Belgium. Association of Road Racing Statisticians (2016-11-16). Retrieved 2020-07-01.
Belgian Championships. GBR Athletics. Retrieved 2020-07-01.

External links
Royal Belgian Athletics Federation website

National cross country running competitions
Athletics competitions in Belgium
Annual sporting events in Belgium
Recurring sporting events established in 1896
1896 establishments in Belgium
Cross country running in Belgium